T. articulata  may refer to:
 Tamarix articulata, the farash, a moderate sized tree species
 Tetraclinis articulata, the sandarac or barbary thuja, an evergreen coniferous tree species endemic to the western Mediterranean region
 Tropidophora articulata, a land snail species

See also
 Articulata (disambiguation)